Echinothambematidae is a family of crustaceans belonging to the order Isopoda.

Genera:
 Echinothambema Menzies, 1956
 Vemathambema Menzies, 1962

References

Isopoda